Westye Egeberg (16 August 1770 – 27 February 1830) was a Danish born, Norwegian businessperson. He founded Westye Egeberg & Co. a Norwegian  timber company  that existed from 1800 to 1929.

Biography
Egeberg was born on the island of  Als at Sønderborg in the region of  Syddanmark, Denmark. He re-located to Norway in 1786. He married Anna Sophie Muus (1775–1862) and was the father of several children including Westye Martinus Egeberg (1805-1898), physician Christian Egeberg (1809-1874) and composer Fredrikke Egeberg (1815–1861). 

In 1800, he founded the timber trade company Westye Egeberg & Co in Christiania (now Oslo), Norway.  He purchased the Gahnsbruket timber lands in Fet  near Lake Øyeren  in Akershus. This formed the basis for an important lumber company and was passed on through generations. He controlled the company until his death in 1830. 

From 1830-51, his son Westye Martinus Egeberg managed the firm. Brothers Peder Cappelen Egeberg  (1810-1874) and Christian August Egeberg (1809–1874) became co-owners and took control of the company in 1851.  In 1874, management of the company was passed down to Ferdinand Julian Egeberg (1842-1921) and Einar Westye Egeberg (1851-1940).   From 1911,    Westye Parr Egeberg (1877-1959) controlled the firm. 

After the financial crash in 1929, the company and all assets were sold.

References

1770 births
1830 deaths
People from Sønderborg Municipality
Norwegian company founders
Danish emigrants to Norway